1242 Zambesia is a dark background asteroid from the central regions of the asteroid belt, approximately  in diameter. It was discovered on 28 April 1932, by South African astronomer Cyril Jackson at the Union Observatory in Johannesburg. The asteroid was named for the large Zambezi basin in southern Africa.

Orbit and classification 

Zambesia is a non-family asteroid from the main belt's background population. It orbits the Sun in the central main-belt at a distance of 2.2–3.3 AU once every 4 years and 6 months (1,655 days; semi-major axis of 2.74 AU). Its orbit has an eccentricity of 0.19 and an inclination of 10° with respect to the ecliptic.

The body's observation arc begins at the United States Naval Observatory in February 1908, more than 26 years prior to its official discovery observation at Johannesburg.

Naming 

This minor planet was named after the Zambezi river valley, partially part of the former British Central Africa Protectorate. The official naming citation was mentioned in The Names of the Minor Planets by Paul Herget in 1955. The large Zambezi basin stretches across modern Angola, Botswana, Mozambique, Namibia, Zambia and Zimbabwe.

Physical characteristics 

In both the Tholen- and SMASS-like taxonomy of the Small Solar System Objects Spectroscopic Survey (S3OS2), Zambesia is a common, carbonaceous C-type asteroid.

Rotation period 

In October 2015, a rotational lightcurve of Zambesia was obtained by a group of Spanish astronomers. Lightcurve analysis gave a rotation period of 15.72 hours with a brightness variation of 0.15 magnitude. Previous photometric observations gave a divergent period of 17.305 and 24+ hours.

Diameter and albedo 

According to the surveys carried out by the Infrared Astronomical Satellite IRAS, the Japanese Akari satellite and the NEOWISE mission of NASA's Wide-field Infrared Survey Explorer, Zambesia measures between 42.16 and 72.818 kilometers in diameter and its surface has an albedo between 0.0252 and 0.0708.

The Collaborative Asteroid Lightcurve Link derives an albedo of 0.0541 and a diameter of 47.54 kilometers based on an absolute magnitude of 10.4.

Notes

References

External links 
 Dictionary of Minor Planet Names, Google books
 Asteroids and comets rotation curves, CdR – Observatoire de Genève, Raoul Behrend
 Discovery Circumstances: Numbered Minor Planets (1)-(5000) – Minor Planet Center
 
 

001242
Discoveries by Cyril Jackson (astronomer)
Named minor planets
19320428